Inside Out is a Disney media franchise created by Pixar Animation Studios. Pete Docter wrote and directed the first film, while Kelsey Mann will be the director and Meg LeFauve will be the writer of the second one. Amy Poehler, Phyllis Smith, Bill Hader, Lewis Black, and Mindy Kaling are part of the cast. The first film, Inside Out, was released in June 2015 and received acclaim from critics, winning the Academy Award for Best Animated Feature. The second film, Inside Out 2, will be released in June 2024.

The franchise takes place inside the mind of a girl named Riley, with multiple personified emotions administer her thoughts and actions throughout her life.

Films

Inside Out (2015)

Inside Out is the fifteenth Pixar film. The film follows the inner workings inside the mind of a young girl named Riley, who adapts to her family's relocation, as five personified emotions administer her thoughts and actions.

The film was released on June 19, 2015, in the United States, and was nominated for two awards at the 88th Academy Awards, winning Best Animated Feature.

Inside Out 2 (2024)

Inside Out 2 will be the twenty ninth Pixar film. The film will follow a teenage Riley with a "new set of personified emotions".

The film will be released in the United States on June 14, 2024.

Short films

Riley's First Date? (2015)

Riley's First Date? was released in November 3, 2015 on the first film's  Blu-ray release with Josh Cooley as director and writer.

The short follows the events of the 2015 film Inside Out and involves Riley's parents and their emotions, suspecting that Riley is going out on a date with a boy named Jordan.

Video games

Inside Out: Thought Bubbles (2015)
Inside Out: Thought Bubbles is a mobile Puzzle Bobble-style game, was released in 2015 for some app stores.

Disney Infinity 3.0 (2015)

Disney Infinity 3.0 (2015) includes a platformer-type Inside Out playset featuring the emotions as playable characters.

Disney Crossy Road (2016)

Disney Crossy Road was released in 2016, and features Inside Out characters.

Disney Emoji Blitz (2016)
Disney Emoji Blitz was released in 2016, and contains Inside Out emojis.

Lego The Incredibles (2018)

Bing Bong becomes a playable character in Lego The Incredibles.

Disney Heroes: Battle Mode (2018)
Disney Heroes: Battle Mode was released in 2018, and features Inside Out characters.

Cast and characters

Crew

Reception

Box office performance

Critical and public response

Academy Awards

Theme park attractions
Inside Out Emotional Whirlwind at Disney California Adventure at the Disneyland Resort.
Inside Out: Joyful Sweets on Disney Cruise Line's ship Disney Wish.

References

Comedy film franchises
Animated film series
Pixar franchises
Children's film series
2010s English-language films
2020s English-language films
Film franchises introduced in 2015